Mount Pendleton could mean:

 Mount Pendleton (Alaska), a peak of the Alaska Range northeast of Mount McKinley (Denali)
 Mount Pendleton (British Columbia), a peak in British Columbia